Jurbanite is a sulfate mineral with the chemical formula AlSO4(OH)·5H2O. Its molecular weight is 230.13 g/mol. It crystallizes in the monoclinic system and is dimorphous with the orthorhombic mineral rostite.
Jurbanite occurs as a secondary (post-mine) mineral in mines containing sulfide minerals.

Jurbanite was first described for an occurrence in the San Manuel mine of Pinal County, Arizona and first described in 1976s. It was named for Joseph John Urban, the mineral collector who discovered it.

References

Aluminium minerals
Sulfate minerals
Monoclinic minerals
Minerals in space group 14
Minerals described in 1976